The Intel 80386EX (386EX) is a variant of the Intel 386 microprocessor designed for embedded systems. Introduced in August 1994 and was successful in the market being used aboard several orbiting satellites and microsatellites.

Intel did not manufacture another integrated x86 processor until 2007, when it confirmed the Enhanced Pentium M-based Tolapai (EP80579).

Characteristics
 Introduced August 1994
 Variant of 80386SX intended for embedded systems
 26-bit memory addressing for up to 64 MiB of DRAM
 16-bit data bus, limiting performance but reducing system cost
 Static core, i.e. may run as slowly (and thus, power efficiently) as desired, down to full halt
 On-chip peripherals:
 clock and power management
 timers/counters
 watchdog timer
 serial I/O units (synchronous and asynchronous) and parallel I/O
 DMA
 RAM refresh
 JTAG test logic
 Significantly more successful than the 80376
 Used aboard several orbiting satellites and microsatellites
 Used in NASA's FlightLinux project
 Used in USRobotics Courier I modem V.everything (Internal ISA and External RS232 ISDN Terminal Adapters with 56KBPS analog remote access server).
 Used in Ericsson R290 and Globalstar/Qualcomm GSP-1600 satellite phone.
 Used in many older Garmin GPS units, such as the GPS 48, II, III, and 12.
 Used in Akai S5000 & S6000 digital samplers.
 Used in Nokia 9000 Communicator phone.
 Used in Swarco ITC-2 traffic light controller.

See also
Intel 80186/Intel 80188
Intel 80376
Intel Timna
Atom (system on chip)
Intel Quark

References

External links
386EX characteristics

80386Ex